Thérèse Island is a small island off the western coast of Mahé in the Seychelles. It has 700 m long white sand beaches, with numerous coconut palms. There is a reef protecting the south shore of the island. Thérèse Island, along with its sister island Conception Island, is part of Port Glaud district of Mahé, the main island of the Seychelles.

The island is uninhabited but tourists frequently visit it for its water-sports including scuba diving, snorkeling, water skiing, sailing, windsurfing, and deep sea fishing.

There is a restaurant on the island serving Creole cuisine.

Administration
The island belongs to Port Glaud District. 
The island is for sale

Tourism
Today, the island's main industry is tourism.

Image gallery

References

External links 

 National Bureau of Statistics
 info
 Mahe Map 2015
 Info on the island

Islands of Port Glaud
Uninhabited islands of Seychelles
Tourist attractions in Seychelles